Gavin Deas is the pen name for the collaborative works of authors Gavin Smith and Stephen Deas.

Works
 Elite: Wanted (2014)
 Empires: Infiltration (2014)
 Empires: Extraction (2014)

Scottish novelists
Pseudonymous writers